The Private Security Authority (PSA)   is the independent statutory body in Ireland that regulates private security services. It was established under the Private Security Services Act 2004. It is responsible for the protection of the public and clients of the security industry by promoting a high quality standards-based licensing system for businesses and individuals working in the industry.

Functions
Control and supervision of persons providing security services and improving standards.
Granting, renewing, suspending and revoking of licences.
Establishing and maintaining a register of licensees.
Issuing identity cards to licensees which must be on view when working.
 Specifying qualifications, standards or requirements for the granting of licences.
Undertaking or commissioning research activities necessary for the planning, development and provision of those services.
Establishing and maintaining a register of licensees.
Specifying standards to be observed in the provision of security services.
Administering a system of investigation and adjudication of complaints.
Advising the Minister for Justice, Equality and Law Reform and keeping the Minister informed of developments that would assist in developing policy.

Sectors regulated
 Door Supervisor,
 Installer of Electronic Security Equipment,
 Security Guard,
 Providers of Protected forms of Transport,
 Locksmiths,
 Supplier and Installers of Safes,
 Private Investigators, and 
 Security Consultants.

These sectors are further divided to include event security and monitoring of intruder alarm and CCTV equipment.

Register
It maintains a register of licensed providers of security services and a register of licensed employees and the services for which they are licensed to provide.

References

External links
Official Website
Building Security Services
PSA Strategic Plan 2014-2017

Physical security
Private security industry
Department of Justice (Ireland)
Government agencies of the Republic of Ireland
Government agencies established in 2004